When I Close My Eyes is a 1993 Slovenian thriller film directed by Franci Slak. The film was selected as the Slovenian entry for the Best Foreign Language Film at the 66th Academy Awards, but was not accepted as a nominee.

Cast
 Petra Govc as Anna
 Pavle Ravnohrib as Inspector
 Mira Sardo as Aunt
 Valter Dragan as Ivan

See also
 List of submissions to the 66th Academy Awards for Best Foreign Language Film
 List of Slovenian submissions for the Academy Award for Best Foreign Language Film

References

External links
 

1993 films
1993 thriller films
Slovene-language films